Skúli Nielsen (born 8 February 1937) is an Icelandic footballer. He played in two matches for the Iceland national football team in 1957.

References

External links
 

1937 births
Living people
Skuli Nielsen
Skuli Nielsen
Place of birth missing (living people)
Association footballers not categorized by position